Aglaia Papa (1904–84) was a Greek painter.

Life

Aglaia Papa was born in Corfu in 1904.
Her family lived in Janicat, then in the Ottoman Empire, now in Albania.
Her older sister Katina Papa (1903–57) would become a well-known author.
When she was a teenager the Papa family fled persecution by Turks and Albanians in the region and settled in Corfu.
She attended courses in painting in Corfu with Marco Zavitzianos and Konstantinos Parthenis.
She studied at the Athens School of Fine Arts under Nikolaos Lytras, Konstantinos Parthenis and Thomas Thomopoulos.
After graduating she continued to study in Trieste, Milan and Vienna, where she took classes in art history.
She returned to Greece and became a teacher of painting and decorative arts at the  Vocational School of Amalieiou Orphanage.
After the death of her sister Katina she arranged for publication of Katina's novel "In a girls' high school" and a collection of Katina's poems.
Aglaia Papa died in Piraeus in 1984.

Work

Papa was a prolific artist whose work was well received by contemporary critics.
She held several solo exhibitions, and she participated in group exhibitions including the Venice Biennale (1934 and 1936) and Alexandria (1957).
Her earlier work was mainly landscapes and portraits. Later she produced purely abstract compositions.
23 of her paintings are held by the Municipal Gallery of Corfu.
The Municipal Art Gallery of Ioannina also holds some of her work.

Publications

Notes

Sources

 
 
 
 

1904 births
1984 deaths
Greek women painters
Artists from Corfu
20th-century Greek women artists
20th-century Greek painters